The Under 17 Bundesliga (German: B-Junioren Bundesliga) is the highest level of play in German football for male juniors between the ages of 15 and 17. It was formed in 2007 and operates in three regional divisions with 14 clubs each. At the end of season, the three league winners and one of the runners-up determine the German champions for this age group.

History
The league was formed in 2007, when the five U 17 Regionalligas merged to form the three Bundesligas as follows:
 Under 17 Bundesliga North/Northeast formed from:
 Under 17 Regionalliga North
 Under 17 Regionalliga Northeast
 Under 17 Bundesliga South/Southwest formed from: 
 Under 17 Regionalliga South
 Under 17 Regionalliga Southwest
 Under 17 Bundesliga West formed from: 
 Under 17 Regionalliga West

As such, the German Football Association followed the example it had set with the Under 19 Bundesliga in 2003, which were reorganised in the same fashion.

The Regionalligas themselves had only been formed in 2000, to replace an even more regionalised system with separate leagues for every regional football association.

Modus
The clubs in each of the three divisions play a home-and-away round whereby there is no inter-league play. Every club plays therefore 26 regular season games. The bottom three teams in each division are relegated to the next level below, in turn, the best three teams from the region are promoted.

The winner of each league plus the runners-up of the South/Southwest region play in the finals round for the German Under 17 championship. The semi-finals are played in a home-and-away format. If the two semi-final teams playing each other are level on points and goals after the second game, there will be a penalty shoot-out. No extra time will be played.

The two semi-final winners reach the final, which is held at the location of the winner of the predetermined semi-final A, unless the team's stadium does not comply with DFB requirement, in which case an alternative venue will be determined. In the final, which is one game only, in case of a draw after normal time, a 20-minute extra time will be played. If the game is still a draw, a penalty shoot-out will determine the winner.

Geography

The three Bundesligas are not geographically balanced, North/Northeast covers a large area while West a rather small one, but in population terms, the arrangement is much more level. The three leagues cover the following states:

 Under 17 Bundesliga North/Northeast 
 Berlin
 Brandenburg
 Bremen
 Hamburg
 Lower Saxony
 Mecklenburg-Vorpommern
 Saxony
 Saxony-Anhalt
 Schleswig-Holstein
 Thuringia
 Under 17 Bundesliga South/Southwest 
 Baden-Württemberg
 Bavaria
 Hesse
 Rhineland-Palatinate
 Saarland
 Under 17 Bundesliga West 
 North Rhine-Westphalia

League pyramid
Below the three Bundesligas, a number of second-tier leagues exist which teams are promoted from and relegated to. The league system operates as follows for the 2008–09 season.

Under 17 Bundesliga North/Northeast
The league has two second divisions as the tier below, these being:
 Regionalliga North
 Regionalliga Northeast

The league champions are directly promoted while the two runners-ups play each other for a third promotion spot

Under 17 Bundesliga South/Southwest
The league has four second divisions as the tier below, these being:
 Regionalliga Southwest
 Hessenliga
 Oberliga Baden-Württemberg
 Bayernliga

The winners of the Oberliga Baden-Württemberg and Bayernliga are directly promoted. A third promoted team is determined between the winners of the Hessenliga and the Regionalliga Southwest.

Under 17 Bundesliga West
The league has three second divisions as the tier below, these being:
 Verbandsliga Mittelrhein
 Verbandsliga Niederrhein
 Westfalenliga

The three league champions are directly promoted.

Levels of youth football
German football recognises seven levels of junior football, determined by age and labeled with letters, whereby A is the oldest. In the A level, mixed teams of male and females are not permitted while in B and C mixed teams are allowed if the parents or guardians of the children permit it. Below the C level, mixed teams are generally permitted without restrictions.

League winners
The champions of the three divisions:

Championship winners
The German under 17 football championship begun in 1977, with the first final being played on 3 July 1977 in Niefern.

Pre-Bundesliga era

Bundesliga era

 Winner in bold.
 (2) denotes the number of titles the club has won at this stage when it won more than one.
Source: Alle B-Junioren-Meister  official DFB website: List of all champions, accessed: 16 November 2008

Winners & Finalists
As of 2022, this is the standing in the all-time winners list:

 On five occasions, the Bundesliga champions also won the German under 17 title:
 1989: FC Bayern Munich
 1996: Borussia Dortmund
 1997: FC Bayern Munich
 2001: FC Bayern Munich
 2017: FC Bayern Munich
 On two occasions, the Bundesliga champions also won the German under 17 and under 19 title:
 1996: Borussia Dortmund
 2001: FC Bayern Munich
 On four occasions, the under 19 champions also won the under 17 title:
 1987: Bayer Uerdingen
 1996: Borussia Dortmund
 1998: Borussia Dortmund
 2001: FC Bayern Munich

Clubs & league finishes
The clubs and their league finishes in the Under 17 Bundesliga since 2007–08. Also shown are the final placing of the qualifying season 2006–07 and the Regionalliga or region, in color, the clubs qualified from:

North/Northeast

South/Southwest

West

Key

Top scorers
The league's top scorers:

North/Northeast
The top scorers of the North/Northeast division:

South/Southwest
The top scorers of the South/Southwest division:

West
The top scorers of the West division:

References

Sources
 Deutschlands Fußball in Zahlen,  An annual publication with tables and results from the Bundesliga to Verbandsliga/Landesliga, publisher: DSFS
 kicker Almanach,  The yearbook on German football from Bundesliga to Oberliga, since 1937, published by the kicker Sports Magazine
 Die Deutsche Liga-Chronik 1945–2005  History of German football from 1945 to 2005 in tables, publisher: DSFS, published: 2006

External links 
 Weltfussball.de Round-by-round results and tables of the Under 17 Bundesliga 

Youth football in Germany
2007 establishments in Germany
Bundesliga